Czechoslovakia competed at the 1936 Summer Olympics in Berlin, Germany. 190 competitors, 175 men and 15 women, took part in 102 events in 17 sports.

Medalists

Athletics

Basketball

Boxing

Canoeing

Cycling

Five cyclists, all men, represented Czechoslovakia in 1936.

Individual road race
 Josef Lošek
 Vilém Jakl
   Miroslav Jung
 Hans Leutelt
 Miloslav Loos

Team road race
 Josef Lošek
 Vilém Jakl
   Miroslav Jung
 Hans Leutelt
 Miloslav Loos

Diving

Equestrian

Fencing

13 fencers, 11 men and 2 women, represented Czechoslovakia in 1936.

Men's foil
 Jiří Jesenský
 Bohuslav Kirchmann
 Hervarth Frass von Friedenfeldt

Men's team foil
 Hervarth Frass von Friedenfeldt, František Vohryzek, Jiří Jesenský, Bohuslav Kirchmann, Josef Hildebrand

Men's épée
 Josef Kunt
 Robert Bergmann
 František Vohryzek

Men's team épée
 Robert Bergmann, František Vohryzek, Bohuslav Kirchmann, Josef Kunt, Alfred Klausnitzer, Václav Rais

Men's sabre
 Jozef Benedik
 Hervarth Frass von Friedenfeldt
 Bohuslav Kirchmann

Men's team sabre
 Josef Jungmann, Jozef Benedik, Hervarth Frass von Friedenfeldt, Bohuslav Kirchmann, Josef Hildebrand

Women's foil
 Marie Šedivá
 Carmen Raisová

Gymnastics

Rowing

Czechoslovakia had 17 rowers participate in four out of seven rowing events in 1936.
 Men's single sculls
 Jiří Zavřel

 Men's double sculls
 Vladimír Vaina
 Josef Straka

 Men's coxed four
 František Maloň
 Alfred Lerbretier
 Jan Matoušek
 Jaroslav Mysliveček
 Josef Jabor (cox)

 Men's eight
 Karel Brandstätter
 Pavel Parák
 Jan Holobrádek
 Ladislav Smolík
 František Šír
 František Kobzík
 Rudolf Baránek
 Antonín Hrstka
 Bedřich Procházka (cox)

Sailing

Shooting

Seven shooters represented Czechoslovakia in 1936.

25 m rapid fire pistol
 Jan Gasche
 František Pokorný
 Josef Kopecký

50 m pistol
 Václav Krecl
 Jan Koller

50 m rifle, prone
 František Čermák
 Jaroslav Mach
 František Pokorný

Swimming

Eric Lansky

Water polo

Weightlifting

Wrestling

Art competitions

References

External links
Official Olympic Reports
International Olympic Committee results database

Nations at the 1936 Summer Olympics
1936
Summer Olympics